The Boss Baby: Back in the Crib is an American computer-animated comedy streaming television series produced by DreamWorks Animation Television and developed by Brandon Sawyer that premiered on May 19, 2022. While Back in Business was a follow up to the 2017 film, the series serves as a follow-up to the 2021 film The Boss Baby: Family Business, loosely based on the books by Marla Frazee. The second season is scheduled to premiere on April 13, 2023.

Summary 
Taking place after the events of the second film, Theodore Templeton is forced to revert to his old Boss Baby self after being framed for embezzlement. Crashing with his older brother Tim and his two nieces, brainy big kid Tabitha and fellow Baby Corp employee Tina, he'll have to co-lead Tina's new Field Team fighting to increase Baby Love while keeping a new group of arch-nemeses, The Uncuddleables, from destroying Baby Corp itself.

Cast 

JP Karliak as Theodore Lindsey "Ted" Templeton Jr. / The Boss Baby
Ariana Greenblatt as Tabitha Templeton
Mary Faber as Tina Templeton / The New Boss Baby
Max Mittelman as Timothy Leslie "Tim" Templeton
Pierce Gagnon as Teenager Tim
Krizia Bajos as Carol Templeton and I.T. Baby Cammy
Alex Cazares as JJ and Staci
Karan Soni as Pip
Zeke Alton as Dez
Nicole Byer as NannyCam No Filter CEO Baby
Grace Kaufman as Mia
Antony Del Rio as Antonio
Ben Pierce as Austin
Kyle Chandler as Ranger Safety Binkerton
Mara Junot as R&D Baby Simmons
Kari Wahlgren as Marsha Krinkle and Katja
Isabella Crovetti as Yvette
Kevin Michael Richardson as Buddy from HR, Jimbo, Amal and Agent Brown
Andy Richter as Board Member Bradley
Andy Daly as Sheriff Potty Pardner
Dee Bradley Baker as Curtis "Lumpy" the Park Duck and Precious Templeton
Diedrich Bader as Junior Fancy Jr.
Josh Keaton as Harve
Cissy Jones as Hilde
Hope Levy as Peg
Brandon Scott as CEO Baby Hendershot
Aparna Nacherla as Frankie
Nicole Gose as Melissa
Amy Walker as Aoife
Brian George as Milton Livree
Taran Killam as Ace Perfection
Cobie Smulders as Stella Chimeric

Episodes

Production 
Inspiration for the series happens when creator Brandon Sawyer watched a rough cut of The Boss Baby: Family Business by McGrath and McCullers. The series was worked on during the production of the sequel.

Animation for the series was provided by Technicolor Animation Productions and Toiion (who have done work for Spirit Riding Free).

Release 
The series premiered on Netflix on May 19, 2022. A second season is set to be released on April 13, 2023.

Reception
Common Sense Media gave it a 2 out of 5 stars for too much dark sarcasm and consumerism in unpleasant series.

References

External links 
 
 

2022 American television series debuts
2020s American animated television series
American children's animated comedy television series
American computer-animated television series
Animated television series about children
Animated television series about families
Animated television shows based on films
The Boss Baby (franchise)
English-language Netflix original programming
Netflix children's programming
Television series based on adaptations
Television series by DreamWorks Animation
Television series by Universal Television